Muraoka may refer to:

Muraoka (surname), a Japanese surname
Muraoka, Hyōgo, a former town in Mikata District, Hyōgo Prefecture, Japan
5124 Muraoka, a main-belt asteroid